The 1861 Texas gubernatorial election was held on November 4, 1861 to elect the governor of Texas. Incumbent Governor Edward Clark was running for his first full term but was defeated by Francis Lubbock by a margin of 124 votes.

The election was the first of two held in Texas during the American Civil War. Texas was, at the time, a Confederate state.

Results

References

1861
Texas
Gubernatorial
November 1861 events